The Zotye T800 was a mid-size CUV by Zotye, and it is the 7-seater version of the Zotye T700 mid-size crossover produced by Zotye, sharing everything before the C-pillars.

Overview

Pricing of the Zotye T800 ranges from 131,800 to 185,800 yuan. In Vietnam, it is on sale as the 7-seater version of Zotye Z8.

Similarities with Zotye T700
Like its brother - the T700, Zotye T800 appears with a Range Rover-like design and a front grille that heavily resembles the Maserati Levante. Both T700 and T800 use the 4G63 turbo engine from Mitsubishi mated to a 6-speed dual-clutch transmission.

References

Notes

External links

Cars of China
T800
Crossover sport utility vehicles
Mid-size sport utility vehicles
Front-wheel-drive vehicles
All-wheel-drive vehicles
Cars introduced in 2016